Dynamite Dan is a 1924 American drama film directed by Bruce M. Mitchell and featuring Kenneth MacDonald and Boris Karloff. The film is about a young dockworker who is framed for a robbery he did not commit by his foreman, gangster Tony Garcia. Prints of this film survive and are available on DVD. Boris Karloff, who plays the gangster, only appears in the beginning and end of the film.

Plot
A young dockworker named Dan McLeod (Kenneth MacDonald) is accused of a robbery at his job on the loading dock that was actually committed by his foreman Tony Garcia (Boris Karloff). Dan escapes from the police and a comical detective named Sherlock Jones (Eddie Harris) sets out to track him down and recapture him. Dan gets a job as a gym teacher at his girlfriend Helen's school, but gets fired soon after. Next he becomes a professional boxer and calls himself Dynamite Dan. Dan asks his girlfriend to spy for him at his old job and learn who it was that framed him for the robbery. In the film's finale, Dan has to box a gangster named Brute Lacy (Harry Woods) in the ring for the championship as his girlfriend is being menaced by gangster Tony Garcia.

Cast
 Kenneth MacDonald as Dynamite Dan McLeod
 Frank Rice as Boss
 Boris Karloff as Tony Garcia
 Eddie Harris as Sherlock Jones
 Diana Alden as Helen Havens (Dan's girlfriend)
 Harry Woods as Brute Lacy the boxer
 Jack Richardson as Spike Moran
 Emily Gerdes as Toodles
 Jack Waltemeyer as Tim O'Rourke
 Max Ascher
 Carrie Daumery as The School Principal
 Mrs. Harold Lockwood as School Teacher

See also
 List of American films of 1924
 Boris Karloff filmography

References

External links

1924 films
1924 drama films
1920s sports drama films
American silent feature films
American black-and-white films
American boxing films
American sports drama films
Films directed by Bruce M. Mitchell
1920s American films
Silent American drama films
1920s English-language films
Silent sports drama films